Li Dan (李丹, born 19 September 1988 in Guangzhou, China) is a female Chinese trampoline gymnast. She was World Champion at the 2010 Trampoline World Championships in Metz, France. She also became World Champion at the 2015 Trampoline World Championships held in Odense, Denmark.

References

External links
 

1988 births
Living people
Chinese female trampolinists
Olympic gymnasts of China
Olympic medalists in gymnastics
2016 Olympic bronze medalists for China
Gymnasts at the 2016 Summer Olympics
World Games gold medalists
Competitors at the 2013 World Games
Asian Games medalists in gymnastics
Asian Games gold medalists for China
Medalists at the 2014 Asian Games
Gymnasts at the 2014 Asian Games
Medalists at the Trampoline Gymnastics World Championships
Gymnasts from Guangzhou
21st-century Chinese women